This Iz the Japanese Kabuki Rock is the sixth studio album by Miyavi. It was released on March 19, 2008. A limited edition was released on SHM-CD, a supposedly high-quality CD format developed by Universal, and includes a DVD featuring music videos and documentary footage. The album is advertised as the "final stage" of Miyavi's recent "Neo Visualizm" theme, and features the artist's performance troupe, the Kavki Boiz, including an MC, various instrumentalists, and other artists. The album charted 25th on Oricon and 27th on Billboard Japan.

The documentary on the second disc features footage of the making-of the album. The film shows a month-by-month breakdown of each song being recorded in various studios.

A working title for "Jpn Pride" was "Azn Pride". Songs that did not make the album or underwent rewriting include "Morning Glory" and "Winding Road". The title of "Azn Pride" was later used for his greatest hits compilation for Korea and Taiwan, titled Azn Pride -This Iz the Japanese Kabuki Rock-.

Track listing

Personnel 
 Miyavi – vocals, composer, lyricist, vocal percussion, acoustic guitar, electric guitar, electric sitar, Dobro guitar, shamisen, bells, tambourine, Gigpig
 Tyko – rapping (1, 2, 3, 4, 6, 7, 8, 9), khoomii (5), beatboxing (4)
 Hige-chang – bass guitar (1)
 Ryo Yamagata – drums (1, 3, 4, 6)
 DJ 1/2 – turntable (1, 2, 6, 7, 9, 10)
 Saro – tap dancing (1, 8, 9), djembe (6)
 Yuko Nakakita – percussion (1, 5, 6, 10)
 Isao Murakami – taiko (1)
 Masahide Sakuma – bass guitar (2, 6, 7, 8, 9, 10), keyboard (8, 10)
 Soul Toul – drums (2, 7, 8, 9, 10)
 Mitsuru Nasuno – bass guitar (3, 4)
 DJ Hanger – turntable (3, 8)
 Yoshinari Takegami – saxophone  (3)
 M.C.A-T – programming (3)
 Sugizo – electric guitar (7)
Note: Other than for lyrics and music composition, the album's liner notes offer no credits for the eleventh track "Thanx Givin' Day".

References

2008 albums
Miyavi albums
Universal Music Japan albums